Johnny Dauwe (31 May 1966 – 25 June 2003) was a Belgian cyclist. He competed in the road race at the 1988 Summer Olympics.

References

External links
 

1966 births
2003 deaths
Belgian male cyclists
Olympic cyclists of Belgium
Cyclists at the 1988 Summer Olympics
Cyclists from Antwerp